Robert Alan Dahl (December 17, 1915 – February 5, 2014) was an American political theorist and Sterling Professor of Political Science at Yale University. 

He established the pluralist theory of democracy—in which political outcomes are enacted through competitive, if unequal, interest groups—and introduced "polyarchy" as a descriptor of actual democratic governance. An originator of "empirical theory" and known for advancing behavioralist characterizations of political power, Dahl's research focused on the nature of decision making in actual institutions, such as American cities. He is the most important scholar associated with the pluralist approach to describing and understanding both city and national power structures. 

In addition to his work on the descriptive theory of democracy, he was long occupied with the formulation of the constituent elements of democracy considered as a theoretical but realizable ideal. By virtue of the cogency, clarity, and veracity of his portrayal of some of the key characteristics of realizable-ideal democracy, as well as his descriptive analysis of the dynamics of modern pluralist-democracy, he is considered one of the greatest theorists of democracy in history.

Biography
Dahl was born in Inwood, Iowa, on December 17, 1915. His father Peter came from a Norwegian family, while his mother Vera came from a Protestant American background.

He received his undergraduate degree from the University of Washington in 1936 and his Ph.D. from Yale in 1940. 

After receiving his Ph.D., Dahl worked in the government in Washington DC and then volunteered for a spell in the US army. He served in Europe during World War II, was the leader of a small reconnaissance platoon in an infantry regiment, and earned a Bronze Star. He led a platoon that took part in a major offensive in November 1944.

After World War II, Dahl returned to Yale in 1946, where he was offered a temporary position teaching American government. The position became permanent, and Dahl remained at Yale his entire career, until his retirement in 1986. He was Eugene Meyer Professor of Political Science from 1955 to 1964, and Sterling Professor from 1964 to 1986. Dahl was departmental chair from 1957 to 1962.

Dahl served as president of the American Political Science Association in 1966/67.

Dahl was married to Mary Bartlett until her passing in 1970, and then to Ann Sale, a Presbyterian.

Awards and honors

Over his career, Dahl received many prestigious awards and prizes. 

 1950 Guggenheim fellow

 1955–1956 Fellow of the Center for Advanced Study in the Behavioral Sciences

 1960 American Academy of Arts and Sciences 

 1962 Dahl’s book Who Governs? is awarded the 1962 Woodrow Wilson Foundation Book Award.

 1967 Fellow of the Center for Advanced Study in Behavioral Sciences

 1972 National Academy of Sciences

 1978 Guggenheim fellow

 1990 Dahl's work Democracy and Its Critics (1989) won the Woodrow Wilson Foundation Book Award.

 1995 Dahl was the first recipient of the Johan Skytte Prize in Political Science in 1995.

 2016 Robert A. Dahl Award was established in honor of Dr. Robert Dahl by the American Political Science Association in 2016.

 American Philosophical Society

 British Academy (as a corresponding fellow).

Academic research

Early writings and pluralism

Dahl's influential early books include A Preface to Democratic Theory (1956), Who Governs? (1961), and Pluralist Democracy in the United States (1967), which presented pluralistic explanations for political rule in the United States. 

In the late 1950s and early 1960s, he was involved in an academic disagreement with C. Wright Mills over the nature of politics in the United States.  Mills held that America's governments are in the grasp of a unitary and demographically narrow power elite. Dahl responded that there are many different elites involved, who have to work both in contention and in compromise with one another. If this is not democracy in a populist sense, Dahl contended, it is at least polyarchy (or pluralism). In perhaps his best known work, Who Governs? (1961), he examines the power structures (both formal and informal) in the city of New Haven, Connecticut, as a case study, and finds that it supports this view.

From the late 1960s onwards, his conclusions were challenged by scholars such as G. William Domhoff and Charles E. Lindblom (a friend and colleague of Dahl).

Writing on power and influence
One of his many contributions is his explication of the varieties of power, which he defines as A getting B to do what A wants. Dahl prefers the more neutral "influence terms" (Michael G. Roskin), which he arrayed on a scale from best to worst: 
 Rational persuasion, the nicest form of influence, means telling the truth and explaining why someone should do something, like a doctor convincing a patient to stop smoking. 
 Manipulative persuasion, a notch lower, means lying or misleading to get someone to do something. 
 Inducement, still lower, means offering rewards or punishments to get someone to do something, like bribery.
 Power threatens severe punishment, such as jail or loss of a job.
 Coercion is power with no way out.
 Physical force is backing up coercion with use or threat of bodily harm.

Thus, the governments that use influence at the higher end of the scale are best. The worst use the unpleasant forms of influence at the lower end.

Writing on democracy and polyarchies

Dahl wrote many books on democracy throughout his career. The most influential are Polyarchy: Participation and Opposition (1971) and Democracy and Its Critics (1989).

In Polyarchy, Dahl uses the term "polyarchy" to refer to actual cases of democracy and provides a comprehensive discussion of possible causes of polyarchy.

Criteria of a democratic process

In his book, Democracy and Its Critics, Dahl clarifies his view about democracy. No modern country meets the ideal of democracy, which is as a theoretical utopia. More specifically, argued that five criteria could be used for evaluating how democratic a process is:

 Effective participation - All members ought to have equal and effective opportunities to make their views known to other members. 
 Voting equality - All members ought to have an equal and effective opportunity to vote, with votes counted as equal.
 Enlightened understanding - All members must have equal and effective opportunities to learn about the consequences and alternatives of a proposal. 
 Control of the agenda - All members must have the exclusive opportunity  to choose if or how matters will be placed on the agenda. 
 Inclusion of adults - All or most of adult permanent residents should be given the full rights of the above four criteria.

Institutions of polyarchy

However, as in his earlier book Polyarchy, Dahl held that some countries approximated those ideals and could be classified as "polyarchies" inasmuch as they had "seven institutions, all of which must exist for a government to be classified as a polyarchy":
 Elected officials - "Control over government decisions about policy is constitutionally vested in elected officials."
 Free and fair elections - "Elected officials are chosen in frequent and fairly conducted elections in which coercion is comparatively uncommon."
 Inclusive suffrage - "Practically all adults have the right to vote in the election of officials."
 Right to run for office - "Practically all adults have the right to run for elective offices in the government, though age limits may be higher for holding office than for the suffrage."
 Freedom of expression - "Citizens have a right to express themselves without the danger of severe punishment on political matters broadly defined, including criticism of officials, the government, the regime, the socioeconomic order, and the prevailing ideology."
 Alternative information - "Citizens have a right to seek out alternative sources of information. Moreover, alternative sources of information exist and are protected by laws."
 Associational autonomy - "citizens ... have a right to form relatively independent associations or organizations, including independent political parties and interest groups."

Conditions favourable for democratic institutions 
In his book On Democracy, Dahl sets out five conditions that favor democratic institutions. He deems three of them essential and the remaining two solely favourable.

Essential condition for democracy:

 Control of military and police by elected officials
 Democratic beliefs and political culture 
 No strong foreign control hostile to democracy

Favourable conditions for democracy:

 A modern market economy and society 
 Weak subcultural pluralism

On the value of democracy 
In his book On Democracy, Dahl addressed the question "Why should we support democracy?" and argued that "democracy has
at least ten advantages" relative to nondemocracies:

 Avoiding tyranny
 Essential rights
 General freedom
 Self determination
 Moral autonomy
 Human development
 Protecting essential personal interests
 Political equality
 Peace-seeking
 Prosperity

Later writings

In his later writing, Dahl examined democracy, in particular in the United States, with a critical view.

In How Democratic Is the American Constitution? (2001), Dahl argued that the US Constitution is much less democratic than it ought to be, given that its authors were operating from a position of "profound ignorance" about the future.  However, he adds that there is little or nothing that can be done about this "short of some constitutional breakdown, which I neither foresee nor, certainly, wish for."

In On Political Equality (2006), Dahl addresses the issue of equality and discusses how and why governments have fallen short of their democratic ideals. He assesses the contemporary political landscape in the United States.

Major works
The best known of Dahl's works include:
 Dahl, Robert A. 1950. Congress and Foreign Policy. New York: Harcourt, Brace
 
 
 Dahl, Robert A. (1957). "The Concept of Power." Systems Research and Behavioral Science 2(3), 201–215.
 Dahl, Robert A. (1957). "Decision-Making in a Democracy: The Supreme Court as a National Policy-Maker." Journal of Public Law 6: 279–295.
 
 
 
 
 
 
 
 
 
  Full text.

Resources on Dahl and his research 
 Baldwin, David, and Mark Haugaard (eds.). 2018. Robert A. Dahl: An Unended Quest. Routledge.
 Blokland, Hans Theodorus. 2011. Pluralism Democracy and Political Knowledge. Robert a Dahl and His Critics on Modern Politics. Burlington, VT: Ashgate.
 Crothers, Charles H.G. 2015. "Dahl, Robert A (1915–2014)," pp. 655-60, in James Wright (ed.), International Encyclopaedia of Social and Behavioural Sciences, 2nd ed. Vol. 5, Elsevier. 
 Dahl, Robert A. 2005. After the Goldrush: Growing up in Skagway. Xlibris Corporation. [A description by Dahl of his days growing up in Alaska.]
 Dahl, Robert A., and Margaret Levi. 2009. “A Conversation with Robert A. Dahl". Annual Review of Political Science 12: 1-9
 Fabbrini, Sergio. 2003. "Bringing Robert A. Dahl's Theory of Democracy to Europe." Annual Review of Political Science 6:1: 119-137.
 Fisichella, Domenico. 2009. “Robert Dahl: The Democratic Polyarchy,” pp. 11-36, in Donatella Campus and Gianfranco Pasquino (eds.), Masters of Political Science. Colchester, UK: ECPR Press.
 Mayhew, David. 2018. "A Biographical Memoir". National Academy of Sciences. 
 
 Shapiro, Ian, and Grant Reeher (eds.). 1988. Power, Inequality, and Democratic Politics: Essays in Honor of Robert A. Dahl. Westview Press.
 Utter, Glenn H.  and Charles Lockhart (eds.). 2002. American Political Scientists: A Dictionary (2nd ed.) pp 75–78,  online.
Interview by Richard Snyder. 2007. "Robert A. Dahl: Normative Theory, Empirical Research and Democracy," pp. 113–149, in Gerardo L. Munck and Richard Snyder, Passion, Craft, and Method in Comparative Politics. Baltimore, Md.: The Johns Hopkins University Press.

See also  
 Democracy
 Pluralism (political theory)

References

External links

 Robert A. Dahl in the Yale University website.
 Robert A. Dahl in the Encyclopædia Britannica.
 Annual Reviews Conversations Interview with Robert A. Dahl (video)
Robert Alan Dahl Papers. Manuscripts and Archives, Yale University Library.

1915 births
2014 deaths
American political scientists
American political philosophers
Yale University alumni
Yale University faculty
Public administration scholars
Members of the United States National Academy of Sciences
Yale Sterling Professors
University of Washington College of Arts and Sciences alumni
Social Science Research Council
Corresponding Fellows of the British Academy